"Virus" is a song written by Bob Arnz and Gerd Zimmermann and recorded by German singer LaFee. It was released as the first single from LaFee's debut album LaFee. The single reached fourteen in both the German and Austrian Singles Charts when released in March 2006. An English version of the song, entitled "Scabies", later appeared on LaFee's third studio album Shut Up.

Track listing
CD Maxi Single
 "Virus" - 3:55
 "Virus" (Akustik version) - 3:56
 "Virus" (Radio edit) - 3:46
 "Du lebst" - 4:24

Charts

Weekly charts

Year-end charts

References

2006 singles
LaFee songs
2006 songs
Songs written by Bob Arnz
EMI Records singles
Songs written by Gerd Zimmermann (songwriter)